The Wingfoot Air Express was a non-rigid airship (i.e. blimp) that crashed into the Illinois Trust and Savings Building in Chicago on Monday July 21, 1919. The Type FD dirigible, owned by the Goodyear Tire and Rubber Company, was transporting people from Grant Park to the White City amusement park. One crew member, two passengers and ten bank employees were killed in what was, up to that point, the worst dirigible disaster in United States history.

The crash

When it became clear the dirigible was failing, pilot Jack Boettner and chief mechanic Harry Wacker used parachutes to jump to safety. A second mechanic, Carl Alfred Weaver, died when his parachute caught fire, while passenger Earl H. Davenport, a publicity agent for the White City Amusement Park, had his parachute get tangled in the cables which suspended the gondola from the envelope, leaving him hanging fifty feet below the burning craft; he was killed instantly when the airship crashed. The fifth person who parachuted from the dirigible, Chicago Daily News photographer Milton Norton, broke both legs on landing and later died in hospital.

At the Illinois Trust & Savings Bank building at the northeast corner of LaSalle Street and Jackson Boulevard, 150 employees were closing for the day in and around the main banking hall, which was illuminated by a large skylight. The remains of the Wingfoot struck the bank's skylight, with flaming debris falling through to the banking hall below. Ten employees were killed and 27 injured as a result.

Aftermath
In addition to causing the city of Chicago to adopt a new set of rules for aviation over the city, the crash led to the closing of the Grant Park Airstrip and the creation of Chicago Air Park.

See also 

 List of airship accidents

References

Further reading
Krist, Gary. City of Scoundrels: The Twelve Days of Disaster That Gave Birth to Modern Chicago. New York, NY: Crown Publisher, 2012. .
The Columns, Illinois Trust and Savings Bank, July 1919
Rules adopted by the Chicago City Council, Journal of the Proceedings, April 8, 1921, p. 2230.

Aviation accidents and incidents in Illinois
Disasters in Illinois
Airliner accidents and incidents involving in-flight explosions
History of Chicago
Transportation in Chicago
1919 in Illinois
Fires in Illinois
Goodyear Tire and Rubber Company
Accidents and incidents involving balloons and airships
Airliner accidents and incidents caused by in-flight fires
Aviation accidents and incidents in the United States in 1919
1919 fires in the United States